Horseshoe Falls is the Canadian portion of Niagara Falls on the Niagara River, also known as the Canadian Falls

Horseshoe Falls may also refer to:

Places
Horseshoe Falls (British Columbia)
Horseshoe Falls (South Africa) near Sabie, Mpumalanga
Horseshoe Falls (Tasmania)
Horseshoe Falls (Wales)